The night skink, nocturnal desert-skink or striated egernia  (Liopholis striata) is a species of skink, a lizard in the family Scincidae. The species is endemic to western Australia.

References

Skinks of Australia
Liopholis
Reptiles described in 1919
Taxa named by Richard Sternfeld